Duke Shen of Chen or Chen Shen Gong may refer to:

 Duke Shēn of Chen (陳申公), the second ruler of Chen
 Duke Shèn of Chen (陳慎公), the fifth ruler of Chen